HMS Leopard was a 50-gun fourth rate ship of the line of the Royal Navy, built at Rotherhithe and launched on 15 March 1703.

Leopard underwent a rebuild according to the 1719 Establishment at Woolwich, and was relaunched on 18 April 1721. Leopard served until 1739, when she was broken up.

Notes

References

Lavery, Brian (2003) The Ship of the Line - Volume 1: The development of the battlefleet 1650-1850. Conway Maritime Press. .

Ships of the line of the Royal Navy
1700s ships